Rubén Reyes Díaz (born 5 January 1979) is a Spanish retired footballer who played as a midfielder, and is a manager.

In a career spent mainly in the lower leagues, Reyes amassed Segunda División totals of 89 games and three goals in representation of five clubs. He appeared for Oviedo and Villarreal in La Liga, totalling 21 matches.

Club career
Born in Gijón, Asturias, Reyes began his professional career with local Real Avilés Industrial, in Segunda División B. For the 2000–01 season he moved to La Liga with neighbouring Real Oviedo, making his first appearance in the competition on 22 October 2000 in a 3–1 home win against RC Celta de Vigo; the following month he scored in a 4–1 victory over Real Valladolid also at the Estadio Carlos Tartiere, but the club eventually failed to retain its status as third from bottom.

For 2002–03, Reyes joined Villarreal CF again in the top division, for three years. He appeared very rarely with the Valencian team, and finished the campaign with Segunda División's Getafe CF; in the following season, also with the Madrid side, he achieved a first-ever promotion to the top tier, but only saw action in two games (both from the bench).

Reyes then signed for Albacete Balompié, but did not play one single second in the first part of 2004–05, due to injury. From January–June 2005 he was loaned to Pontevedra CF in the second level, playing 15 matches in a relegation-ending campaign; in the following year's January transfer window the same befell, with the club now one division down, and staying down after failing in the promotion play-offs.

After being finally released by Albacete, Reyes finally joined Pontevedra permanently, being one of the Galicians' cornerstones in 2006–07, although they once again did not promote. The following campaign he joined Rayo Vallecano, returning to the second tier at the first attempt.

References

External links

1979 births
Living people
Footballers from Gijón
Spanish footballers
Association football midfielders
La Liga players
Segunda División players
Segunda División B players
Tercera División players
Real Avilés CF footballers
Real Oviedo Vetusta players
Real Oviedo players
Villarreal CF players
Getafe CF footballers
Albacete Balompié players
Pontevedra CF footballers
Rayo Vallecano players
CF Palencia footballers
CD Paracuellos Antamira players
Spanish football managers